Atomerőmű KSC Szekszárd, is a Hungarian women's basketball team, that is based in Szekszárd (Hungary), as that competes in the top flight of the Hungarian women's basketball leagues.

History
The club played first time at the Hungarian First class of women in 1975. The head coach of the self-educated team was Pál Buttás. The name of the team at that time was Szekszárd Vasas Sport Kör. The Basketball Sport Club Szekszárd was founded in February 1988, and since 1989 it has been playing its home games in the Szekszárd City Sports Hall. In 1991, the first foreign player to join the team, while in 2005 the first American basketball player. Until 2000, the difficult financial situation of the club also determined the team's performance, when the Paks Nuclear Power Plant became the name-giving sponsor of the team. In the 2016-2017 and subsequent seasons, the club played in the finals of the Hungarian championship, but beaten by Sopron Basket on both occasions. In the 2017-2018 season, they were able to celebrate the Hungarian Cup victory.

Players

Current squad

Depth chart

Honours

International competitions
 EuroCup
 3rd Place (1): 2020–21

Domestic competitions
 Hungarian Women's National Championship
 Runners-up (4): 2016–17, 2017–18, 2020–21, 2021–22
 Hungarian Cup
 Winner (1): 2018
 Runners-up (2): 2019, 2020

Season by season

In European competition
Source: basketball.eurobasket.com
Participations in EuroLeague: 2x
Participations in EuroCup: 4x

References

External links
 
 Profile at EuroCup Women
 Profile at eurobasket.com

Women's basketball teams in Hungary